On February 1, 2004 Moldova introduced a new closed telephone numbering plan with an open dialing plan. The country code is +373, adopted in 1993. Previously, when Moldova was part of the Soviet Union, it used the country code +7 and the area code 0422.

Numbering scheme

Telephone numbers in Moldova follow an open numbering plan and consist of 8 national significant numbers (NSN). The National Significant Number consists of 2-3 digits for the National Destination Code and 5-6 digits for the Subscriber Number (SN).

National destination code 
National destination codes are allocated as follows:

The trunk prefix in Moldova is 0.

Area codes

Dialling example 
 0-22-xx-xx-xx – call within Chişinău
 0-xxx-xx-x-xx – call between other localities in Moldova
 0-xx-xx-xx-xx – call between localities and mobile phone companies
 +373-xxx-xx-xxx – call between Moldova and Transnistria

References

External links

Moldova
Telecommunications in Moldova
Telephone numbers